The Pensacola Light is a lighthouse at Pensacola Bay, in Florida. It is the third iteration of what was originally a lightship, the Aurora Borealis, and remains an aid to navigation.

History 
The first Pensacola Light was the lightship Aurora Borealis. It was moved to Pensacola in 1823 from its previous post at the mouth of the Mississippi River after a lighthouse had been completed there. Because of frequent rough seas, the lightship had to be anchored inside the bay entrance, behind Santa Rosa Island, and could not reliably be seen from ships outside the bay.

Tower 
In 1825 a  tower was built on a  bluff at the south entrance to Pensacola Bay. This light was also partially obscured by trees close to the tower and on Santa Rosa Island. In 1858 a new tower was built on the north side of the bay entrance, and was lit on January 1, 1859.

The new location allowed the tower to serve as the rear range light marking the passage across the Pensacola Bar. Little is known of the first front range light. The Pensacola Bar Beacon was removed from service and demolished some time in the early 1900s.

At the start of the Civil War, Pensacola was controlled by Confederate forces, while Fort Pickens across the bay remained in Union hands. Confederate authorities removed the lens from the lighthouse, and most of the lighthouse supplies were requisitioned for the war effort. In November 1861 an artillery duel between the two forces damaged the lighthouse tower.

Confederate forces later evacuated Pensacola, and were replaced by Union forces. In 1863 the Pensacola Light was relit using a fourth-order Fresnel lens. A new first-order lens was placed in the tower in 1869. The tower was all white during the Civil War. Later, the upper two-thirds of the tower was painted black. Electricity was introduced to the lighthouse in 1939, eliminating the need to rewind the light rotation clockworks every 4½ hours. The light was automated in 1965. The lighthouse tower and associated buildings were placed on the National Register of Historic Places in 1974.

In 1989, the lighthouse and keeper's quarters were listed in A Guide to Florida's Historic Architecture, published by the University of Florida Press.

Present day 
The Pensacola Light remains an active aid to navigation. The Coast Guard Auxiliary Flotilla 17 had provided tours of the lighthouse, but they were discontinued in 2007. As of 2009, the lighthouse reopened on a limited basis for public tours, and since early 2011 it has been open 7 days a week. Maintenance and tour operations are currently conducted by the Pensacola Lighthouse Association. The 1869 keeper's quarters, adjacent to the lighthouse tower, houses a museum and gift shop also administered by the Pensacola Lighthouse Association. The Association is a 501 (c) 3 non-profit, with a small staff and a large volunteer base.

Notes

References
McCarthy, Kevin M. (1990). Florida Lighthouses, Paintings by William L. Trotter, Gainesville, Florida: University of Florida Press. .
National Park Service Inventory of Historic Light Stations - Florida Lighthouses  - retrieved February 3, 2006

Pensacola Lighthouse History - retrieved February 3, 2006
AMATEUR RADIO LIGHTHOUSE SOCIETY - List of Lighthouse Coordinates - retrieved February 3, 2006
Lighthouse Depot - Pensacola Bar Beacon - retrieved February 7, 2006

External links

Pensacola Lighthouse and Museum - official site
Historic American Buildings Survey (Library of Congress) Survey number HABS FL-147

Lighthouses completed in 1825
Lighthouses completed in 1859
Buildings and structures in Pensacola, Florida
Lighthouses in Florida
Pensacola metropolitan area
National Register of Historic Places in Escambia County, Florida
Museums in Pensacola, Florida
Lighthouse museums in Florida
History museums in Florida
1825 establishments in Florida Territory
Transportation buildings and structures in Escambia County, Florida